Pinnipedia is an infraorder of mammals in the order Carnivora, composed of seals, sea lions, and the walrus. A member of this group is called a pinniped or a seal. They are widespread throughout the ocean and some larger lakes, primarily in colder waters. Several species exhibit sexual dimorphism, such as the southern elephant seal, where the males can be more than three times as long and six times as massive as the females, or the Ross seal, which has females typically larger than the males. Four seal species are estimated to have over one million members, while seven are classified as endangered with population counts as low as 300, and two, the Caribbean monk seal and the Japanese sea lion, went extinct in the 20th century.

The 34 extant species of Pinnipedia are split into 22 genera within 3 families: Odobenidae, comprising the walrus; Otariidae, the eared seals, split between the sea lions and fur seals; and Phocidae, the earless or true seals. Odobenidae and Otariidae are combined into the superfamily Otarioidea, with Phocidae in Phocoidea. Extinct species have also been placed into the three extant families, as well as the extinct family Desmatophocidae, though most extinct species have not been categorized into a subfamily. Nearly one hundred extinct Pinnipedia species have been discovered, though due to ongoing research and discoveries the exact number and categorization is not fixed.

Conventions

Conservation status codes listed follow the International Union for Conservation of Nature (IUCN) Red List of Threatened Species. Range maps are provided wherever possible; if a range map is not available, a description of the pinniped's range is provided. Ranges are based on the IUCN Red List for that species unless otherwise noted. All extinct species or subspecies listed alongside extant species went extinct after 1500 CE, and are indicated by a dagger symbol "".

Classification
The infraorder Pinnipedia consists of 3 families containing 34 extant species belonging to 22 genera and divided into 48 extant subspecies, as well the extinct Caribbean monk seal and Japanese sea lion species, which are the only pinniped species to go extinct since prehistoric times. This does not include hybrid species or extinct prehistoric species.

 Superfamily Otarioidea
 Family Odobenidae
 Genus Odobenus: 1 species
 Family Otariidae
 Genus Arctocephalus: 8 species
 Genus Callorhinus: 1 species
 Genus Eumetopias: 1 species
 Genus Neophoca: 1 species
 Genus Otaria: 1 species
 Genus Phocarctos: 1 species
 Genus Zalophus: 3 species
 Superfamily Phocoidea
 Family Phocidae
 Genus Cystophora: 1 species
 Genus Erignathus: 1 species
 Genus Halichoerus: 1 species
 Genus Histriophoca: 1 species
 Genus Hydrurga: 1 species
 Genus Leptonychotes: 1 species
 Genus Lobodon: 1 species
 Genus Mirounga: 2 species
 Genus Monachus: 1 species
 Genus Neomonachus: 2 species
 Genus Ommatophoca: 1 species
 Genus Pagophilus: 1 species
 Genus Phoca: 2 species
 Genus Pusa: 3 species

Pinnipeds
The following classification is based on the taxonomy described by Mammal Species of the World (2005), with augmentation by generally accepted proposals made since using molecular phylogenetic analysis. This includes splitting the monk seal genus Monachus into Monachus and Neomonachus, the reorganization of grey seal subspecies, and the removal of the Laptev walrus subspecies.

Family Odobenidae

Family Otariidae

Family Phocidae

Prehistoric pinnipeds

In addition to extant pinnipeds, many prehistoric species have been classified as a part of Pinnipedia. Morphogenic and molecular phylogenic research has placed them within the extant families as well as the extinct families Desmatophocidae and Panotariidae within the Otarioidea superfamily. Within Pinnipedia, prehistoric species have been placed into both extant genera and separate extinct genera. The list of fossil taxa is primarily based on the historiographical data from Valenzuela-Toro and Pyenson (2019), itself largely based on data from the Paleobiology Database, unless otherwise cited. Where available, the approximate time period for the species is given in millions of years before the present (Mya), also based on data from the Paleobiology Database. All listed species are extinct; where a genus or family within Pinnipedia comprises only extinct species, it is indicated with a dagger symbol .

 Superfamily Otarioidea
 Family Odobenidae
 Genus Aivukus (7.3–5.3 Mya)
 A. cedrosensis (7.3–5.3 Mya)
 Genus Archaeodobenus (12–7.2 Mya)
 A. akamatsui (12–7.2 Mya)
 Genus Dusignathus (7.3–2.5 Mya)
 D. santacruzensis (7.3–5.3 Mya)
 D. seftoni (3.6–2.5 Mya)
 Genus Gomphotaria (7.3–5.3 Mya)
 G. pugnax (7.3–5.3 Mya)
 Genus Imagotaria (12–10 Mya)
 I. downsi (12–10 Mya)
 Genus Kamtschatarctos (16–11 Mya)
 K. sinelnikovae (16–11 Mya)
 Genus Nanodobenus (16–7.2 Mya)
 N. arandai (16–7.2 Mya)
 Genus Neotherium (16–13 Mya)
 N. mirum (16–13 Mya)
 Genus Odobenus (0.79 Mya–present)
 O. mandanoensis (0.79–0.12 Mya)
 Genus Ontocetus (4.9–0.012 Mya)
 O. emmonsi (4.9–0.012 Mya)
 Genus Osodobenus
 O. eodon
 Genus Pelagiarctos (16–13 Mya)
 P. thomasi (16–13 Mya)
 Genus Pliopedia (5.4–3.6 Mya)
 P. pacifica (5.4–3.6 Mya)
 Genus Pontolis (12–7.2 Mya)
 P. barroni
 P. kohnoi
 P. magnus (12–7.2 Mya)
 Genus Proneotherium (21–15 Mya)
 P. repenningi (21–15 Mya)
 Genus Protodobenus (5.4–3.6 Mya)
 P. japonicus (5.4–3.6 Mya)
 Genus Prototaria (16–13 Mya)
 P. planicephala (16–13 Mya)
 P. primigena (16–13 Mya)
 Genus Pseudotaria (12–7.2 Mya)
 P. muramotoi (12–7.2 Mya)
 Genus Titanotaria (7.3–5.3 Mya)
 T. orangensis (7.3–5.3 Mya)
 Genus Valenictus (5.4–1.8 Mya)
 V. chulavistensis (4.9–1.8 Mya)
 V. imperialensis (5.4–3.6 Mya)
 Family Otariidae
 Genus Callorhinus (7.3 Mya–present)
 C. gilmorei (3.6–1.8 Mya)
 C. inouei (7.3–3.6 Mya)
 C. macnallyae (7.3–2.5 Mya)
 Genus Hydrarctos (7.3–5.3 Mya)
 H. lomasiensis (7.3–5.3 Mya)
 Genus Neophoca (2.6 Mya–present)
 N. palatina (Pleistocene New Zealand sea lion) (2.6–0.012 Mya)
 Genus Oriensarctos (2.6–0.78 Mya)
 O. watasei (2.6–0.78 Mya)
 Genus Otaria (12 Mya–present)
 O. fischeri (12–7.2 Mya)
 Genus Pithanotaria (7.3–5.3 Mya)
 P. starri (7.3–5.3 Mya)
 Genus Proterozetes (0.79–0.12 Mya)
 P. ulysses (0.79–0.12 Mya)
 Genus Thalassoleon (5.4–3.6 Mya)
 T. mexicanus (5.4–3.6 Mya)
 Family Panotariidae
 Genus Eotaria (21–13 Mya)
 E. circa (16–13 Mya)
 E. crypta (21–13 Mya)
 Superfamily Phocoidea
 Family Desmatophocidae
 Genus Atopotarus (21–13 Mya)
 A. courseni (21–13 Mya)
 Genus Allodesmus (29–7.2 Mya)
 A. demerei (12–7.2 Mya)
 A. kernensis (29–13 Mya)
 A. naorai (14–11 Mya)
 A. packardi (16–11 Mya)
 A. sinanoensis (14–11 Mya)
 A. uraiporensis (16–13 Mya)
 Genus Desmatophoca (24–15 Mya)
 D. brachycephala (24–20 Mya)
 D. oregonensis (21–15 Mya)
 Genus Eodesmus
 E. condoni
 Family Phocidae
 Genus Acrophoca (7.3–5.3 Mya)
 A. longirostris (7.3–5.3 Mya)
 Genus Afrophoca (21–13 Mya)
 A. libyca (21–13 Mya)
 Genus Auroraphoca (5.4–3.6 Mya)
 A. atlantica (5.4–3.6 Mya)
 Genus Australophoca (12–7.2 Mya)
 A. changorum (12–7.2 Mya)
 Genus Batavipusa (12–2.5 Mya)
 B. neerlandica (12–2.5 Mya)
 Genus Callophoca (12–2.5 Mya)
 C. obscura (12–2.5 Mya)
 Genus Cryptophoca (14–9.7 Mya)
 C. maeotica (14–9.7 Mya)
 Genus Devinophoca (14–11 Mya)
 D. claytoni (14–11 Mya)
 D. emryi (14–11 Mya)
 Genus Frisiphoca (12–7.2 Mya)
 F. aberratum (12–7.2 Mya)
 F. affine (12–7.2 Mya)
 Genus Gryphoca (16–3.6 Mya)
 G. nordica (12–3.6 Mya)
 G. similis (16–3.6 Mya)
 Genus Hadrokirus (7.3–5.3 Mya)
 H. martini (7.3–5.3 Mya)
 Genus Histriophoca (13 Mya–present)
 H. alekseevi (13–11 Mya)
 Genus Homiphoca (5.4–3.6 Mya)
 H. capensis (5.4–3.6 Mya)
 Genus Kawas (12–7.2 Mya)
 K. benegasorum (12–7.2 Mya)
 Genus Leptophoca
 L. amphiatlantica
 L. proxima (16–7.2 Mya)
 Genus Messiphoca (7.3–5.3 Mya)
 M. mauretanica (7.3–5.3 Mya)
 Genus Miophoca (7.3–5.3 Mya)
 M. vetusta (7.3–5.3 Mya)
 Genus Monachopsis (12–0.78 Mya)
 M. pontica (12–0.78 Mya)
 Genus Monotherium (12–7.2 Mya)
 M. delognii (12–7.2 Mya)
 Genus Nanophoca (12–3.6 Mya)
 N. vitulinoides (12–3.6 Mya)
 Genus Noriphoca (24–20 Mya)
 N. gaudini (24–20 Mya)
 Genus Pachyphoca (14–7.2 Mya)
 P. chapskii (14–11 Mya)
 P. ukrainica (12–7.2 Mya)
 Genus Palmidophoca (16–13 Mya)
 P. callirhoe (16–13 Mya)
 Genus Phoca (3.6 Mya–present)
 P. moori (3.6–2.5 Mya)
 Genus Phocanella (5.4–3.6 Mya)
 P. pumila (5.4–3.6 Mya)
 Genus Piscophoca (7.3–5.3 Mya)
 P. pacifica (7.3–5.3 Mya)
 Genus Platyphoca (12–3.6 Mya)
 P. danica (12–7.2 Mya)
 P. vulgaris (5.4–3.6 Mya)
 Genus Pliophoca (5.4–2.5 Mya)
 P. etrusca (5.4–2.5 Mya)
 Genus Pontophoca
 P. jutlandica (12–7.2 Mya)
 P. sarmatica (13–11 Mya)
 P. simionescui (13–7.2 Mya)
 Genus Praepusa
 P. archankutica
 P. boeska (5.4–3.6 Mya)
 P. magyaricus (13–11 Mya)
 P. pannonica (13–11 Mya)
 P. vindobonensis (14–0.78 Mya)
 Genus Pristiphoca
 P. occitana (16–2.5 Mya)
 P. rugidens
 Genus Properiptychus (14–11 Mya)
 P. argentinus (14–11 Mya)
 Genus Prophoca (16–0.012 Mya)
 P. rousseaui (16–0.012 Mya)
 Genus Sarmatonectes (13–11 Mya)
 S. sintsovi (13–11 Mya)
 Genus Terranectes (12–5.3 Mya)
 T. magnus (12–5.3 Mya)
 T. parvus (12–5.3 Mya)
 Genus Virginiaphoca(12–3.6 Mya)
 V. magurai (12–3.6 Mya)

Notes

References

 
pinnipedia
pinnipedia